The Iranian ambassador in Damascus is the official representative of the Government in Tehran to the Government of Syria. 

List of representatives

See also
Iran–Syria relations

References 

 
Syria
Iran